Like most countries and territories in Oceania, telecommunications in the Cook Islands is limited by its isolation and low population, with only one major television broadcasting station and six radio stations. However, most residents have a main line or mobile phone. Its telecommunications are mainly provided by Telecom Cook Islands, who is currently working with O3b Networks, Ltd. for faster Internet connection.

In February 2015 the former owner of Telecom Cook Islands Ltd., Spark New Zealand, sold its 60% interest for approximately NZD 23 million (US$17.3 million) to Teleraro Limited.

Telephone

In July 2012, there were about 7,500 main line telephones, which covers about 98% of the country's population. There were approximately 7,800 mobile phones in 2009. Telecom Cook Islands, owned by Spark New Zealand, is the islands' main telephone system and offers international direct dialling, Internet, email, fax, and Telex. The individual islands are connected by a combination of satellite earth stations, microwave systems, and very high frequency and high frequency radiotelephone; within the islands, service is provided by small exchanges connected to subscribers by open wire, cable, and fibre optic cable. For international communication, they rely on the satellite earth station Intelsat.

In 2003, the largest island of Rarotonga started using a GSM/GPRS mobile data service system with GSM 900 by 2013 3G UMTS 900 was introduce covering 98% of Rarotonga with HSPA+. In March 2017 4G+ launch in Rarotonga with LTE700 (B28A) and LTE1800 (B3).

Mobile service covers Aitutaki GSM/GPRS mobile data service system in GSM 900 from 2006 to 2013 while in 2014 3G UMTS 900 was introduce with HSPA+ stand system. In March 2017 4G+ also launch in Aitutaki with LTE700 (B28A).
The rest of the Outer Islands (Pa Enua) mobile was well establish in 2007 with mobile coverage at GSM 900 from Mangaia 3 villages (Oneroa, Ivirua, Tamarua), Atiu, Mauke, Mitiaro, Palmerston in the Southern Group (Pa Enua Tonga) and the Northern Group (Pa Enua Tokerau) Nassau, Pukapuka, Rakahanga, Manihiki 2 Village (Tukao, Tauhunu) and Penrhyn 2 villages (Omoka Tetautua).

The Cook Islands uses the country calling code +682.

Broadcasting

There are six radio stations in the Cook Islands, with one reaching all islands.  there were 14,000 radios.

Cook Islands Television broadcasts from Rarotonga, providing a mix of local news and overseas-sourced programs.  there were 4,000 television sets.

Internet
There were 6,000 Internet users in 2009 and 3,562 Internet hosts as of 2012. The country code top-level domain for the Cook Islands is .ck.

In June 2010, Telecom Cook Islands partnered with O3b Networks, Ltd. to provide faster Internet connection to the Cook Islands. On 25 June 2013 the O3b satellite constellation was launched from an Arianespace Soyuz ST-B rocket in French Guiana. It has a latency of about 100 milliseconds because it is much closer to Earth than standard geostationary satellites, whose latencies can be over 600 milliseconds. Although the initial launch consisted of 4 satellites, as many as 20 may be launched eventually to serve various areas with little or no optical fibre service, the first of which is the Cook Islands.

In December 2015, Alcatel-Lucent and Bluesky Pacific Group announced that they would build the Moana Cable system connecting New Zealand to Hawaii with a single fibre pair branching off to the Cook Islands. The Moana Cable is expected to be completed in 2018.

In July 2020 the Cook Islands were connected to the Manatua One Polynesia Fibre Cable, which links the Cook Islands, Niue, Samoa and Tahiti. The cable has landing points at Rarotonga and Aitutaki.

References

External links
Telecom Cook Islands
Bluesky Cook Islands

 
+Cook